"Some Guys Have All the Love" is a debut song recorded by American country music group Little Texas.  It was released in September 1991 as the lead single from their debut album, First Time for Everything.  It was co-written by the band's lead guitarist Porter Howell and rhythm guitarist Dwayne O'Brien. The song peaked at #8 on the Billboards Hot Country Songs chart and reached #11 on the Canadian RPM country Tracks chart in 1991.

Content
In "Some Guys Have All the Love", the narrator tells his lover how while some guys may have fame and fortune, he's got her and she's all he needs.

Music video
It was their first music video and was directed by Jim May; it begins by introducing each member of the band (showing their boots) and then shows them playing the song.

Chart performance

References

1991 debut singles
1991 songs
Little Texas (band) songs
Songs written by Dwayne O'Brien
Songs written by Porter Howell
Song recordings produced by James Stroud
Warner Records Nashville singles